NABA may refer to:

National Snaffle Bit Association
National School Boards Association
National Survey of Black Americans